Gordon Allen Rice (born 1933) is a Canadian artist.

Biography, education

Gordon Rice was born on 27 September 1933 in Los Angeles, California and educated at Los Angeles City College, University of California at Berkeley, U.C.L.A., and the University of Hawaii (MFA). He exhibited in Los Angeles and Hawaii 1961-1968. Rice is a Canadian citizen who emigrated to Canada in 1968, and has lived and shown in Victoria, British Columbia, Nakusp, Vancouver, and currently White Rock, British Columbia. He has maintained his associations with Los Angeles area artists, and has been notably an associate of Chicano artists Roberto Chavez, Marcus Villagran, and Roberto Gutiérrez. He has shown in Vancouver with his close California friend, Robert Ross, at the Pender Street Gallery in 1977. Rice and Ross exchange collage materials by mail continuously.  In recent years Rice has shown mainly in various commercial galleries or at private shows in Vancouver. 
From 1977 through the 1990s Rice was active as an assistant curator with the Surrey Art Gallery, Surrey, British Columbia and also as a painting instructor at numerous community colleges and the Emily Carr College extension program. His teaching activity carried beyond, into the 2000s.

Work

Through all this time, Gordon Rice has made and continues to make work in these formats: large oil paintings (one of which is in the collection of the Vancouver Art Gallery and another in the collection of the Honolulu Museum of Art), large scale collages, many incorporating photographs; and small or very small collages on paper, watercolours, and drawings. Many of these works are in private collections; one piece on public view is the large oil Corner Still Life in the collection of Fairmont Hotels, hanging in the lobby of the Fairmont Chateau Whistler in Whistler, BC

Rice's work reveals his interest in classical drawing and painting, but also in abstraction and media/surface play, with Asian influences and allusions. Many diverse themes can be found in Rice's work: observation of suburban life; significant themes emerging from mundane materials and subjects; Asian and Pacific Rim influences on North American culture; cluttered interiors and still lifes; human figures in everyday settings (including portraits of his wife Ester); gardens and plants, art films, movies, music, astronomy, literary or philosophical texts, cars and industrial sites/equipment; themes common to the hipster movement of the 1950s and 1960s such as Buddhism, Americana and Canadiana; abstract visual relationships, especially those generated by camera optics or distortions of light and reflections; children's art (including collaged elements from his own daughters and grandchildren); advertising, kitsch, and even camp, especially in elements (labels, advertisements, etc.) which evoke an ironic appreciation of the populist expressiveness of "debased" sentimental, ethnic or commercial material. In the 21st century, the predominant work has been large oil paintings with complex surfaces and evocations of luminosity, and medium-sized collages interpolating photographs, often in large numbers.

The rate of Rice's output has remained consistent from the 1960s to the present (2010), including this use of photographs. The interest in photography pre-dates the rise of the Vancouver School of Photoconceptualism, which Rice took notice of without entering into a particular dialogue with it in his work. Commenting on a tendency to remain aloof from art world trends, Curator and first director of the Charles H. Scott Gallery, Ted Lindberg was already writing in 1974 that "Rice has brought ... to Nakusp fragments of ... the peculiarly Pacific world...," and that "he has an almost panoramic knowledge of the interactions and/or disparities between western European art and several hundred other cultures and subcultures.... This is perhaps why he doesn't worry too much about current vogues."

This or similar ideas appeared in an article Lindberg wrote for Vanguard magazine in 1974, according to a summary entry in the book Art and Architecture in Canada, citing "Gordon Rice's ... interest in manual skill and the Topographical tradition... contrasted with his lack of interest in contemporary art trends."

Curator Greg Bellerby has made the following assessment: "In all his work, he imparts a sense of inquiry and delight with the ordinary life around us."

References

Bibliography

 Introduction by Ted Lindberg.
 Article 6995 in this book is a precis of Ted Lindberg's article "Gordon Rice" in Vanguard 3 no. 3 (April 1974) 3-4. 9 ill.

Further reading
BC Artists Files listing at Vancouver Public Library, includes invitations to private shows, clippings, B&W reproductions of some works: online reference here.
The sights and textures of the West Coast summer, 1976 Vancouver: Equinox Gallery, 1976. Notice of a series of exhibitions held at Equinox Gallery, Vancouver, summer 1976. Exhibitions include Alan Wood, Chris Hayward and Gordon Rice, Jun., 1976; William Featherston and Leonard Brett, Jul., 1976; Allan McWilliams and Bob Evermon, Aug., 1976.

External links
  The Drawing Society of Canada: Over 100 Years of Canadian Drawings
 Art and Architecture in Canada, Volume 1 by Lerner/Williamson,University of Toronto Press, 1991

1933 births
Living people
20th-century Canadian painters
Canadian male painters
21st-century Canadian painters
American emigrants to Canada
Artists from Los Angeles
Artists from Vancouver
Artists from Victoria, British Columbia
Los Angeles City College alumni
People from Surrey, British Columbia
People from White Rock, British Columbia
University of California, Berkeley alumni
University of California, Los Angeles alumni
University of Hawaiʻi alumni
20th-century Canadian male artists
21st-century Canadian male artists